DXIQ (106.3 FM), broadcasting as 106.3 Love Radio, is a radio station owned and operated by Manila Broadcasting Company. Its studio, offices and transmitter are located at the 4th Floor, SG & G Bldg. Fortich St., Malaybalay, Bukidnon.

References

Radio stations established in 1995
Radio stations in Bukidnon